Achaean Doric Greek may refer to:

Doric of Achaea
The Doric Greek dialect spoken in Achaea in the NW Peloponnese, on the islands of Cephalonia and Zakynthos in the Ionian Sea and in the Achaean colonies of Magna Graecia in Southern Italy (including Sybaris and Crotone). This strict Doric dialect was later subject to the influence of mild Doric spoken in Corinthia. It survived to 350 BC. According to Hesychius, Achaeans means "the Greeks but foremost those inhabiting part of the Peloponnese, called Achaea", and he gives these words under the ethnic Achaeans:
καιρότερον kairoteron (Attic: ἐνωρότερον enôroteron)  "earlier" (kairos time, enôros early cf. Horae)
κεφαλίδας kephalidas (Attic: κόρσαι korsai) "sideburns" (kephalides was also an alternative for epalxeis 'bastions' in Greek proper)
σιαλίς sialis (Attic: βλέννος blennos) (cf. blennorrhea) slime, mud (Greek sialon or sielon saliva, modern Greek σάλιο salio)

Achaean Doric Koine
Achaean Doric Koine. The common dialect, used in the decrees of the Achaean League. In Arcadia it can be traced very easily because it differs considerably from the old non-Doric Arcadian (see Arcadocypriot Greek). In Achaea  itself it held its ground until the 1st century BC. The Achaean Doric Koine did not develop the extreme features that are typical of the Aegean Doric and North-West Doric Koine.

References

Sources
Geschichte der Sprachwissenschaften: ein Internationales Handbuch by Sylvain Auroux (2001), p. 442.
A history of ancient Greek: from the beginnings to late antiquity by Anastasios-Phoivos Christidēs, Maria Arapopoulou (2007), p. 484. .

Further reading

Bakker, Egbert J., ed. 2010. A companion to the Ancient Greek language. Oxford: Wiley-Blackwell.
Cassio, Albio Cesare. 2002. "The language of Doric comedy." In The language of Greek comedy. Edited by Anton Willi, 51–83. Oxford: Oxford University Press.
Christidis, Anastasios-Phoivos, ed. 2007. A history of Ancient Greek: From the beginnings to Late Antiquity. Cambridge, UK: Cambridge University Press.
Colvin, Stephen C. 2007. A historical Greek reader: Mycenaean to the koiné. Oxford: Oxford University Press.
Horrocks, Geoffrey. 2010. Greek: A history of the language and its speakers. 2nd ed. Oxford: Wiley-Blackwell.
Palmer, Leonard R. 1980. The Greek language. London: Faber & Faber.

Doric Greek
Ancient Achaea
Ancient Arcadia
Ancient Greek culture